Willoughton Preceptory was a holding of the Knights Templar  in Lincolnshire, England. 
The preceptory stood at the farm still called Temple Garth.

Willoughton, founded during the reign of Stephen, was the richest of the English houses of the Templars. After the suppression of the order in 1312 the house passed to the Hospitallers in 1338. It was dissolved in 1540, the lands passing to King's College, Cambridge.

See also

Other Lincolnshire  Templar preceptories
Aslackby Preceptory, Kesteven
Eagle, Kesteven
Temple Bruer Preceptory
Witham Preceptory, Kesteven

Lincolnshire Templar camerae and granges
Bottesford, Lindsey . Cell of Willougton()
Temple Belwood, Belton, North Lincolnshire
Grantham Angel and Royal
Gainsborough, Lincolnshire
Great Limber, Lindsey
Horkstow, Lindsey Cell of Willoughton.
Mere, Branston and Mere. Probably a grange of Willoughton.

References

Monasteries in Lincolnshire
Knights Templar
1540 disestablishments in England
Preceptories of the Knights Hospitaller in England